Deseado may refer to:

Geographic names and features
 Deseado (crater), a crater on the planet Mars
 Deseado Department, a department in Santa Cruz Province, Argentina
 Deseado Massif, a geological formation in Santa Cruz Province, Argentina
 Deseado River, a river in Santa Cruz Province, Argentina
 Puerto Deseado, a city in Santa Cruz Province, Argentina

Watercraft
 SS Deseado, a passenger ship built by Harland and Wolff in 1912
 MV Deseado, refrigerated cargo ship built by Harland and Wolff in 1942
 Deseado (yacht), a yacht abandoned in 2006

See also